Léon Wieger (born 9 July 1856 in Strasbourg, France - died 25 March 1933 in Xian County, Hebei, China), was a French Jesuit missionary, medical doctor, theologist and sinologist who worked at the Catholic Jesuit mission in Hejian, together with Séraphin Couvreur.

He has published numerous books, on Chinese culture, Taoism, Buddhism and Chinese language.

Notes

References
 L. Bresner 1997, The Fathers of Sinology: From the Ricci Method to Leon Wieger's Remedies

External links
 Short biography and quotes of people praising Wieger (in French)

1856 births
1933 deaths
French sinologists
19th-century French Jesuits
20th-century French Jesuits
French Roman Catholic missionaries
19th-century French physicians
French male non-fiction writers
Jesuit missionaries in China
French expatriates in China
Roman Catholic medical missionaries